Tekka is a miso-condiment that consists of a number of root vegetables (Greater Burdock roots, carrots, Ginger root, and Lotus root) which have been stir-fried and boiled to a concentrated powder. Traditional preparation time used to be 16 hours (on a low fire), yet speedier preparation is possible.

References

Condiments